Jonathan Ford (born 12 April 1968) is an English former professional footballer who played as a defender. Ford made over 200 appearances in the Football League between 1991 and 1999.

Career

Playing career
Born in Stourbridge, Ford began his career in non-league football with Cradley Town. He then played in the Football League for Swansea City, Bradford City, Gillingham and Barnet, before returning to non-league football with Kidderminster Harriers, Telford United, Halesowen Town, Bromsgrove Rovers and Stourbridge. Whilst at Swansea he was a part of the team that won after a penalty shootout in the 1994 Football League Trophy Final.

Coaching career
After retiring as a player, Ford became a football coach.

He is currently the Assistant Manager at Stourbridge.

References

1968 births
Living people
Sportspeople from Stourbridge
Association football defenders
English footballers
Cradley Town F.C. players
Swansea City A.F.C. players
Bradford City A.F.C. players
Gillingham F.C. players
Barnet F.C. players
Kidderminster Harriers F.C. players
Telford United F.C. players
Halesowen Town F.C. players
Bromsgrove Rovers F.C. players
Stourbridge F.C. players
English Football League players